Paronychia rugelii, common name Rugel's nailwort, is a plant native to the US states of Georgia and Florida. It can be found in woodlands and on disturbed sites at elevations below 200 m (667 feet). They are sometimes referred to as sand squares.

Paronychia rugelii is an annual herb up to 50 cm (20 inches) tall, nearly the entire above-ground parts with hairs. Leaves are ovate to lanceolate, up to 6 mm (0.24 inches) long. Flowers are reddish-brown and white.

References

rugelii
Flora of Georgia (U.S. state)
Flora of Florida
Taxa named by Alvan Wentworth Chapman
Taxa named by Robert J. Shuttleworth